Speed of Light is the second and final studio album of actor and pop singer Corbin Bleu. It was released on March 10, 2009, by Hollywood Records.

The album's first single is "Moments That Matter". In December 2008, Bleu performed the song at Kids' Inaugural Concert: We Are the Future.

Album information
For the promotion of the album, Bleu guested in many shows, including the Today show. When asked about the album, Bleu stated:

“I got a chance to really be involved in the studio writing tracks and lyrics, everything. It’s a lot more personal experience and the album itself is a combination of different sounds, electronic, R&B, pop and it’s definitely something you can play loud in the club.”

Critical reception

AllMusic's Stephen Thomas Erlewine states that "Bleu winds up with an album that plays FutureSex/LoveSounds with the sex removed; he has the shimmering synths, the chilly sound, but he's still singing about puppy love, he's still a teen idol. The same can also be said of Speed of Light as a whole: so much of the album is draped in threads borrowed from Timberlake/Timbaland that it's easy to overlook the lingering elements of Radio Disney, even when the strongest reminder, "Moments That Matter," arrives at the beginning of the record."

Singles
"Moments That Matter" is the first single of the album. It was released a teaser from the music video. The song has been featured in Bleu's movie Free Style. Its full video has already premiered in Bleu's MySpace page.

A video for the single, "Celebrate You" was released in January 2009. Bleu performed that song at Disneyland as part of the 25th anniversary of the Walt Disney World Christmas Day Parade. The song is the official song of the "Year of Celebration" at the Disneyland resort and the "What Will You Celebrate?" campaign at the Walt Disney World Resort.

Track listing

Personnel
Adapted credits from the Speed of Light liner notes.

 Chris Gehringer – mastering (Sterling Sound, New York)
 Jon Lind – A&R
 Kahran White – A&R, executive producer
 Elliot Lurie, Stan Rogow – executive producers, management
 Enny Joo – art direction and design
 Joseph Cultice – photography
 Penny Lovell – styling
 Angie Alvarado – groomer

Release history

References

2009 albums
Albums produced by Brian Kennedy (record producer)
Albums produced by Eric Hudson
Albums produced by Matthew Gerrard
Corbin Bleu albums
Hollywood Records albums